Amathole is one of the 7 districts of Eastern Cape province of South Africa. The seat of Amathole is East London. Over 90% of its 892,637 people speak Xhosa (2011 Census). The district code is DC12. "Amathole" means calves, the name of the mountain range and forest which forms the northern boundary of the district.

Government
The Executive Mayor of Amathole District Municipality since 2016 is Khanyile Maneli, the Deputy Mayor is Nomfusi Winnie Nxawe and the Municipal Manager is Thandekile Themba Mnyimba.

Geography

Neighbours
Amathole is surrounded by:
 Chris Hani District (DC13) to the north
 OR Tambo District (DC15) to the north-east
 the Indian Ocean to the south-east
 Sarah Baartman District (DC10) to west

Local municipalities
The district contains the following local municipalities:

Raymond Mhlaba Local Municipality, following amalgamation of Nxuba (24,264; 2.72%) and Nkonkobe (127,115; 14.24%)] municipalities.

Demographics
The following statistics are from the 2011 census.

Languages

Gender

Ethnic group

Age

Politics

Election results
Election results for Amathole in the South African general election, 2004.
 Population 18 and over: 979,166 [58.83% of total population]
 Total votes: 630,953 [37.91% of total population]
 Voting % estimate: 64.44% votes as a % of population 18 and over

References

External links
 Amathole DM Official Website

District municipalities of the Eastern Cape
Amathole District Municipality